The Tussen Tunnel is a  long road tunnel located on County Road 64 in Møre og Romsdal county, Norway. The tunnel has 5,000 daily vehicles. The tunnel was scheduled to be paid off by 2013.

History
The tunnel opened on 13 October 1990 to shorten the trip on County Road 64 from Fræna (now part of Hustadvika) to Molde municipalities; however, the tunnel was privately owned. The tunnel was originally not officially part of the county road. The tunnel was owned by Tusten Tunnelselskap AS, which was owned by several local municipalities and banks.

The tunnel was closed for renovation from 15 February to 16 July 2010. During this time, the Norwegian Public Roads Administration upgraded the road and took over the ownership and operation of the tunnel. The upgrades included replacement of all electro-technical equipment, including lights, ventilation, fire equipment; and the laying of new asphalt.

References

Road tunnels in Møre og Romsdal
Norwegian County Road 64
1990 establishments in Norway
Tunnels completed in 1990
Molde
Hustadvika (municipality)